The Haunting of M is an American 1979 independent horror film directed by Anna Thomas and starring Sheelagh Gilbey, Nini Pitt, Evie Garratt, Alan Hay, and Jo Scott Matthews. This is the only film directed by Thomas, with her husband Gregory Nava acting as a cinematographer. Thomas shot the film in a castle in Scotland inviting a little known cast. The film premiered in the Chicago International Film Festival.

Plot
The film is set in the first years of the twentieth century. The successful actress Halina visits the ball at her family's estate. A group photo is taken, but later she and her sister Marianna are puzzled to see a mysterious person present in the photo, whom none of them recognizes. Then their estate gets haunted by the ghost of a young man that wanders through the corridors, tormenting Marianne. Their aging aunt Teresa finally recognizes the figure in the photo. Digging into the past, Halina discovers that the mysterious man was Teresa's fiance Marion, who was exiled and died under suspicious circumstances after he and Teresa unsuccessfully tried to elope. Later, Halina understands that Marion was killed by her relatives and came back for revenge.

Cast

Sheelagh Gilbey as Marianna
Nini Pitt as Halina
Evie Garratt as Daria
Alan Hay as Karol
Jo Scott Matthews as Aunt Teresa
William Bryant as Marion
Peter Austin as Stefan
Ernest Bale as Stahu
Isolde Cazelet as Yola

Reception
Roger Ebert praised The Haunting of M in his review for The Chicago Sun Times and on a special episode of Sneak Previews about notable low-budget independent films with fellow film critic Gene Siskel (who disagreed with Ebert's enthusiastic praise for the film).

References

External links

1979 films
1979 horror films
American horror films
American independent films
1970s English-language films
1970s American films